Andreas Hakenberger (Krzemień (Kremmin), Pomerania, 1574–1627) was a German composer, and worked in Gdańsk beginning in 1608.

Works, editions and recordings
German madrigals - Neue deutsche Gesange nach Art der welschen Madrigalien for five to eight voices (Gdańsk, 1610),
Latin motets - Sacri Modulorum for eight voices (Szczecin, 1615)
Latin motets - Harmonia Sacra for six to twelve voices (Frankfurt, 1617),

Recordings
motets  De Sancto Spiritu. In nativitate Domini à 12. Cantate Domino.  Voce mea ad Dominum clamavi.  Exultate iusti. Ad te Domine levavi.  De resurrectione Domini.  De Sanctissima Trinitate à 12. De sanctissimo nomine Iesu. De Sancto Bernardo hymnus.  Nigra sum. Surge, propera. Vulnerasti cor meum. Veni in hortum meum.  Veni dilecte mi.  Magnificat. - Schola Cantorum Gedanensis, dir. Jan Łukaszewski on French Accord label and also Polish Accord record label.
motet Beati omnes, qui timent Dominum à 12 recorded on Hanseatic Wedding music. Weser-Renaissance Ensemble Bremen dir. Manfred Cordes. cpo

References

1574 births
1627 deaths
People from Stargard County
People from Pomerania
German Baroque composers
German classical composers
Renaissance composers
17th-century classical composers
German male classical composers
17th-century male musicians